Madame Sin is a 1972 British thriller film directed by David Greene and starring Bette Davis, Robert Wagner, Denholm Elliott and Gordon Jackson. The screenplay was written by Greene and Barry Oringer.

Plot summary
The title character is a vicious villainess who commands a Thought Factory in the Scottish Highlands. Intent on achieving world domination, she kidnaps ex-CIA agent Anthony Lawrence and forces him to help her hijack a secret nuclear weapon: the Polaris submarine.

Cast
 Bette Davis as Madame Sin
 Robert Wagner as Anthony Lawrence
 Denholm Elliott as Malcolm De Vere
 Gordon Jackson as Commander Cavendish
 Dudley Sutton as Monk
 Catherine Schell as Barbara
 Pik-Sen Lim as Nikko 
 Paul Maxwell as Connors 
 David Healy as Braden 
 Alan Dobie as White

Production
The film was originally a pilot for a weekly TV series that failed to make the network's schedule. It was broadcast as an ABC Movie of the Week in the United States on 15 January 1972 and then released in other markets as a feature film.

Filming locations
Exteriors were filmed on location at Ascot, Berkshire; Mull, Argyll in Scotland; and Piccadilly in London. Interiors were shot at the Pinewood Studios in Buckinghamshire.

Reception
Time Out London wrote "Lots of exotic sets and outlandish secret weapons, just a pity it's all rather old hat Bond stuff. Still, with Denholm Elliott giving sterling support as her sycophantic aide, Davis has a ball with some genuinely monstrous lines."

References

External links
 

1972 television films
1972 films
British television films
ABC Movie of the Week
1970s spy films
1970s action thriller films
British spy films
American spy films
Films shot at Pinewood Studios
Films directed by David Greene
1970s English-language films
1970s American films
1970s British films